The Loon River First Nationis a First Nations band government in northern Alberta. A signatory to Treaty 8, it controls three Indian reserves, Loon Lake 235, Loon Prairie 237, and Swampy Lake 236.

References

First Nations governments in Alberta
Cree governments